Brian Nicholas Serven (born May 5, 1995) is an American professional baseball catcher for the Colorado Rockies of Major League Baseball (MLB). Serven was drafted by the Rockies in the fifth round of the 2016 MLB draft. He made his MLB debut in 2022.

Early life
Serven was born in Palm Desert, California. He is childhood friends with infielder Scott Burcham. He attended Palm Desert High School where he led the Aztecs to the California Interscholastic Federation championship his junior year in 2012. 

He attended Arizona State University and played college baseball for the Arizona State Sun Devils. In 2014, he played collegiate summer baseball with the Bourne Braves of the Cape Cod Baseball League.

Career
Serven was drafted by the Colorado Rockies in the fifth round of the 2016 MLB draft. 

Serven did not play in a game in 2020 due to the cancellation of the minor league season because of the COVID-19 pandemic. Returning to action in 2021, Serven spent the year with the Triple-A Albuquerque Isotopes. In 73 games, he slashed .250/.308/.504 with 16 home runs and 38 RBI. He returned to Albuquerque to begin the 2022 season.

On May 17, 2022, Serven was selected to the 40-man roster and promoted to the major leagues for the first time. He made his MLB debut the next day on May 18. In his second game for the Rockies on May 21, 2022, Serven hit two home runs against the New York Mets, becoming the first player in major league history to record his first two career hits with two multiple-run home runs in the same game.

References

External links

1995 births
Living people
People from Palm Desert, California
Baseball players from California
Major League Baseball catchers
Colorado Rockies players
Arizona State Sun Devils baseball players
Bourne Braves players
Grand Junction Rockies players
Asheville Tourists players
Lancaster JetHawks players
Hartford Yard Goats players
Salt River Rafters players
Albuquerque Isotopes players
Tigres del Licey players